GS25 is a South Korean chain of convenience stores operated and owned by GS Retail, a subsidiary company of the GS Group. The headquarters of the company are located at the GS Tower in Gangnam-gu, Seoul. As of June 9, 2020, GS25 operates 13,899 stores.

GS25 is known for having hundreds of locations all over South Korea. They are also known for their large variety of drinks such as different flavored milks and iced beverages. They also carry a variety of Korean snacks as well as ramen, fish cakes, and kimbabs.

History 

GS25, then known as LG25, opened their first store in Dongdaemun-gu, Seoul in 1990. However, in 2005, GS Group split from the LG Corporation, the name of LG25 was correspondingly changed to GS25. In March 2019, GS25 changed their brand identity for the first time since changing their name to GS25. With the new identity, a new slogan of "Lifestyle Platform" began to be applied to all new store signage. However, as of August 2019, most stores still use the former identity.

Foreign operations

Vietnam 
In January 2018, GS25 ventured outside of South Korea for the first time in its history by launching a store in Ho Chi Minh City. As of June 2022, GS25 operates 160 stores throughout Vietnam.

Mongolia 
On May 18, 2021, GS25 officially opened in Mongolia with three stores in Ulaanbaatar. As of December 18, 2022, GS25 has opened 124 stores throughout Ulaanbaatar.

Malaysia 
Malaysia–based KK Super Mart has announced to partnered with GS Retail to launch GS25 in Malaysia following the trend of Korean convenience stores, which both CU & e-mart24 has already arrived in the country. The first outlet will set to be launched on 2023 while targeting to launch 500 outlets within five years.

References

Companies based in Seoul
Companies of South Korea
Convenience stores
GS Group
Multinational companies headquartered in South Korea
Retail companies established in 1990
Retail companies established in 2005
Retail companies of South Korea
South Korean brands
South Korean companies established in 1990
South Korean companies established in 2005